Admittance parameters or Y-parameters (the elements of an admittance matrix or Y-matrix) are properties used in many areas of electrical engineering, such as power, electronics, and telecommunications. These parameters are used to describe the electrical behavior of linear electrical networks. They are also used to describe the small-signal (linearized) response of non-linear networks. Y parameters are also known as short circuited admittance parameters. They are members of a family of similar parameters used in electronic engineering, other examples being: S-parameters, Z-parameters, H-parameters, T-parameters or ABCD-parameters.

The Y-parameter matrix
A Y-parameter matrix describes the behaviour of any linear electrical network that can be regarded as a black box with a number of ports. A port in this context is a pair of electrical terminals carrying equal and opposite currents into and out of the network, and having a particular voltage between them. The Y-matrix gives no information about the behaviour of the network when the currents at any port are not balanced in this way (should this be possible), nor does it give any information about the voltage between terminals not belonging to the same port. Typically, it is intended that each external connection to the network is between the terminals of just one port, so that these limitations are appropriate.

For a generic multi-port network definition, it is assumed that each of the ports is allocated an integer n ranging from 1 to N, where N is the total number of ports. For port n, the associated Y-parameter definition is in terms of the port voltage and port current,  and  respectively.

For all ports the currents may be defined in terms of the Y-parameter matrix and the voltages by the following matrix equation:

where Y is an N × N matrix the elements of which can be indexed using conventional matrix notation. In general the elements of the Y-parameter matrix are complex numbers and functions of frequency. For a one-port network, the Y-matrix reduces to a single element, being the ordinary admittance measured between the two terminals.

Two-port networks

The Y-parameter matrix for the two-port network is probably the most common. In this case the relationship between the port voltages, port currents and the Y-parameter matrix is given by:

.

where

For the general case of an N-port network,

Admittance relations

The input admittance of a two-port network is given by:

where YL is the admittance of the load connected to port two.

Similarly, the output admittance is given by:

where YS is the admittance of the source connected to port one.

Relation to S-parameters

The Y-parameters of a network are related to its S-Parameters by

 

and

 

where  is the identity matrix,  is a diagonal matrix having the square root of the characteristic admittance (the reciprocal of the characteristic impedance) at each port as its non-zero elements,

In these expressions the matrices represented by the bracketed factors commute and so, as shown above, may be written in either order.

Two port
In the special case of a two-port network, with the same and real characteristic admittance  at each port, the above expressions reduce to 

Where

The two-port S-parameters may also be obtained from the equivalent two-port Y-parameters by means of the following expressions.

where

Relation to Z-parameters
Conversion from Z-parameters to Y-parameters is much simpler, as the Y-parameter matrix is just the inverse of the Z-parameter matrix. The following expressions show the applicable relations:

Where

In this case  is the determinant of the Z-parameter matrix.

Vice versa the Y-parameters can be used to determine the Z-parameters, essentially using the
same expressions since

and

Notes

References

See also
 Nodal admittance matrix
 Scattering parameters
 Impedance parameters
 Two-port network
 Hybrid-pi model
 Power gain

Two-port networks
Transfer functions

de:Zweitor#Zweitorgleichungen und Parameter